Ooty, officially known as Udhagamandalam (also known as Ootacamund; abbreviated as Udhagai), is a town and a municipality in the Nilgiris district of the South Indian state of Tamil Nadu. It is a popular hill station located in the Nilgiri Hills. It is popularly called the "Queen of Hill Stations". It was the summer capital of the Madras Presidency.

Originally occupied by the Toda people, the area came under the rule of the East India Company at the end of the 18th century. The economy is based on tourism and agriculture, along with the manufacture of medicines and photographic film. The town is connected by the Nilgiri ghat roads and Nilgiri Mountain Railway. Its natural environment attracts tourists and it is a popular summer destination. In 2011, the town had a population of 88,430.

Etymology
The origin of the name is obscure. The first known written mention of the place is given as Wotokymund in a letter of March 1821 to the Madras Gazette from an unknown correspondent. In early times it was called Ottakal Mandu. The name probably changed under British rule from Udhagamandalam to Ootacamund, and later was shortened to Ooty.

The first part of the name (Ootaca) is probably a corruption of the local name for the central region of the Nilgiri Plateau. Otha-Cal literally means "single stone". This is perhaps a reference to a sacred stone revered by the local Toda people.

"Mund" is the Anglicised form of the Toda word for a village, Mandu.

Ooty is in the Nilgiri hills, meaning the "blue mountains", so named due to the Kurunji flower which blooms every twelve years giving the slopes a bluish tinge.

History

Udhagamandalam was originally a tribal land occupied by the Badaga, Toda, Kota, Irula and
Kurumba people.

The Toda in Nilgiris are first referenced in a record belonging to Hoysala king Vishnuvardhana and his general Punisa, dated 1117 CE. The Toda people were known for raising water buffalo. The people known for farming activities. Nilgiris was ruled by various dynasties like Satavahanas, Gangas, Kadambas, Rashtrakutas, Hoysalas, the Vijayanagara empire and the Rajas of Ummattur (on behalf of Wodeyars of Mysuru). Tipu Sultan captured Nilgiris in the eighteenth century and extended the border by constructing a hideout cave-like structure. The Nilgiris came into possession of British East India Company as part of the ceded lands, held by Tipu Sultan, by the treaty of Srirangapatnam in 1799.

In 1818, J. C. Whish and N. W. Kindersley, assistants to John Sullivan, then Collector of Coimbatore, visited Ooty and submitted a report to him. Sullivan camped at Dimbhatti, north of Kotagiri in January 1819 and was enthralled by the beauty of the place. He wrote to Thomas Munro,
" ... it resembles Switzerland, more than any country of Europe... the hills beautifully wooded and fine strong spring with running water in every valley." The Toda ceded that part of the town to Sullivan and in May 1819, he began to build his bungalow at Dimbhatti. He also started work on a road from Sirumugai to Dimbhatti that year. The road was completed in May 1823, and extended up to Coonoor by 1830–32.

Aranmore Palace in Ooty, served as the summer capital of the Madras Presidency; it was visited by British officials during the colonial days as a popular summer resort. Soldiers were sent to nearby Wellington to recuperate. Wellington is the home of the Madras Regiment of the Indian Army. After Independence, it developed into a popular hill resort.

Geography and climate

Location 
Ooty is situated in the Nilgiri Biosphere Reserve. Many of the forested areas and water bodies are off-limits to most visitors in order to protect this fragile ecosystem. Some areas of the Biosphere Reserve have been earmarked for tourism development, and steps are being undertaken to open these areas to visitors whilst conserving the area.

Climate 
Ooty features a subtropical highland climate (Cwb) under Köppen climate classification. Despite its location in the tropics, in contrast with most of South India, Ooty generally features mild conditions and is spring-like throughout the year. However, night time in the months of January and February is typically cold.

The rainy season in Ooty is generally cool and windy with high humidity. The wind chill may fall to as low as  during the day time. Wind is always high throughout the year.

Places of interest
Ooty is a popular tourist attraction with many places of interest in and around the town.

Gardens and parks

The Government Rose Garden (formerly Centenary Rose Park) is the largest rose garden in India. Today this garden has one of the largest collection of roses in the country with more than 20,000 varieties of roses of 2,800 cultivars. The collection includes hybrid tea roses, Miniature Roses, Polyanthas, Papagena, Floribunda, Ramblers, Yakimour and roses of unusual colours like black and green.

The  Ooty Botanical Gardens was laid out in 1847 and is maintained by the Government of Tamil Nadu. The Botanical Garden is lush, green, and well-maintained. A flower show along with an exhibition of rare plant species is held every May. The gardens have around a thousand species, both exotic and indigenous, of plants, shrubs, ferns, trees, herbal and bonsai plants. The garden has a 20-million-year-old fossilised tree.

Deer Park is located on the edge of Ooty Lake. It is the highest altitude zoo in India aside from the zoo in Nainital, Uttarakhand. This park was formed to house a number of species of deer and other animals.

Lakes and dams

The boat house established alongside the lake, which offers boating facilities to tourists, is a major tourist attraction in Ooty. It was constructed in 1824 by John Sullivan, the first collector of Ooty. The lake was formed by damming the mountain streams flowing down Ooty valley. The lake is set among groves of Eucalyptus trees with a railway line running along one bank. During the summer season in May, boat races and boat pageantry are organised for two days at the lake.

The Pykara is considered very sacred by the Todas. The Pykara river rises at Mukurthi peak and passes through a hilly tract, generally keeping to the north and turns to the west after reaching the plateau's edge. A boat house by the Pykara falls and dam is an added attraction to tourists. It is a picnic spot and a film shoot location on the slopes of the Wenlock Downs. The various tourist activities at the dam include fishing and studying nature and the environment. Parsons Valley Reservoir is the primary water source for the town and is mainly in a reserved forest and thus largely off-limits to visitors. Emerald Lake, Avalanche Lake and Porthimund Lake are other lakes in the region.

Tribal huts and museum

There are a few traditional Toda  (known as Dogles) on the hills above the Botanical Garden, where Todas still dwell. There are other Toda settlements in the area, notably Kandal Mund near Old Ooty. Although many Toda have abandoned their traditional distinctive huts for concrete houses, a movement is now afoot to build tradition barrel-vaulted huts, and during the last decade forty new huts have been built and many Toda sacred dairies renovated.

The Tribal Museum is part of the campus of Tribal Research Centre which is in Muthorai Palada ( from Ooty town). It is home to rare artifacts and photographs of tribal groups of Tamil Nadu as well as the Andaman and Nicobar Islands, and anthropological and archaeological primitive human culture and heritage. The Tribal Museum also displays houses belonging to Toda, Kota, Paniya, Kurumba, and Kanikarans.

Nilgiri Mountain Railway

The Nilgiri Mountain Railway was built by the British in 1908, and was initially operated by the Madras Railway Company. The railway still relies on its fleet of steam locomotives.<ref> Indian Hill Railways (2010). [DVD]. England. 3DI Production for BBC4.</ref> NMR comes under the jurisdiction of the newly formed Salem Division. In July 2005, UNESCO added the Nilgiri Mountain Railway as an extension to the World Heritage Site of Darjeeling Himalayan Railway, the site then became known as "Mountain Railways of India." after it satisfied the necessary criteria, thus forcing abandonment of the modernisation plans. For the past several years diesel locomotives have taken over from steam on the section between Coonoor and Udhagamandalam. Local people and tourists have led a demand for steam locos to once again haul this section.

Historical buildings

Stone House is the first bungalow constructed in Ooty. It was built by John Sullivan and was called Kal Bangala by the tribals (Kal means stone in local tribal language). John Sullivan started building Stone House in 1822, acquiring land from the Todas at ₹. Today, it is the official residence for the principal of the Government Arts College, Ooty

St Stephen's Church is located on the road to Mysore in Ooty, in the state of Tamil Nadu, India. It is one of the oldest churches in the Nilgiris district. The church dates back to the 19th century. Stephen Rumbold Lushington, the then governor of Madras, who keenly felt the need for a cathedral in Ooty which was exclusively for the British, laid the foundation stone for the church on 23 April 1829, to coincide with the birthday of King George IV. St Stephen's Church was consecrated by John Matthias Turner, Bishop of Calcutta, on 5 November 1830. It was thrown open to public communion on Easter Sunday 3 April 1831. It came under the Church of South India in 1947. The architect in charge was John James Underwood, Captain, Madras Regiment.

St. Thomas Church, a parish in the Anglican diocese of Ooty, was begun in 1867, with the foundation stone being laid on 1 May by Lt. Gen. Howard Dowker. Construction was completed 20 October 1870, and its first service was held in 1871. Among the famous graves in the churchyard are those of Josiah John Goodwin, the British stenographer of Swami Vivekananda, and William Patrick Adam, the British governor of Madras, whose grave is topped by the stunning pillar monument dedicated to St. Thomas, the tallest structure in Ooty. The church's graveyard was used as a setting in David Lean's 1984 movie, A Passage to India, which was based on E. M. Forster's novel of the same name.

In 1882, the rules of the game of snooker were first drafted and codified in the "Ooty Club" by Sir Neville Chamberlain (not the Prime Minister). The club still houses the billiards table that was used.

Tea Factory
Visitors can learn about the origin of different kinds of tea leaves all across the globe and the history of tea in India. In the factory, the process of tea processing by Cut, Twist and Curl (CTC) machines is clearly displayed. At the end of the visit, one can taste different types of tea and buy tea souvenirs. Other nearby tea factories include Doddabetta Tea factory and Bench Mark Tea Factory.

Radio Telescope
The Ooty Radio Telescope was completed in 1970. It is part of the National Centre for Radio Astrophysics (NCRA) of the Tata Institute of Fundamental Research (TIFR), which is funded by the Government of India through the Department of Atomic Energy.

Demographics

According to the 2011 census, Udhagamandalam had a population of 88,430 with a sex-ratio of 1,053 females for every 1,000 males, much above the national average of 929. A total of 7,781 were under the age of six, constituting 3,915 males and 3,866 females.The average literacy of the city in 2011 was 90.2%, compared to the national average of 72.99%. The city had a total of 23,235 households. There were a total of 35,981 workers, comprising 636 cultivators, 5,194 agricultural labourers, 292 in household industries, 26,411 other workers, 3,448 marginal workers, 65 marginal cultivators, 828 marginal agricultural labourers, 56 marginal workers in household industries and 2,499 other marginal workers. As per the religious census of 2011, Udhagamandalam had 64.36% Hindus, 21.25% Christians, 13.37% Muslims, 0.03% Sikhs, 0.3% Buddhists, 0.4% Jains, 0.28% following other religions and 0.02% following no religion or did not indicate any religious preference.

Tamil is the official language of Udhagamandalam. Languages native to the Nilgiris including Badaga, Paniya, Irula and Kurumba. Due to its proximity to the neighbouring states of Kerala and Karnataka and being a tourist destination, Malayalam, Kannada and English are also spoken and understood to an extent. According to the 2011 census, the most widely spoken languages in Udhagamandalam taluk were Tamil, spoken by 88,896, followed by Badaga with 41,213 and Kannada with 27,070 speakers.

Administration and politics
Ooty is the district headquarters of the Nilgiris district. The Ootacamund assembly constituency is part of the Nilgiris Lok Sabha constituency.

 Culture 
Recreation

Snooker originated on the billiard tables of the Ootacamund Club, invented by an army officer Neville Francis Fitzgerald Chamberlain. There was also a cricket ground with regular matches played between teams from the Army, the Indian Civil Service and the business sector. Visiting teams would come from various parts of India as well as from the island of Ceylon.

There were riding stables and kennels at Ooty and the Ootacamund Hounds hunted across the surrounding countryside and the open grasslands of the Wenlock Downs, named after Beilby Lawley, 3rd Baron Wenlock. Horse races are held at Ooty Racecourse. In many of the south Indian movies in 70s 80s,90s Ooty was the obvious choice for the outdoor shoots. Priyadarshan's Kilukkam was shot in Ootty. Many Bollywood movies Karz, Sadma, Maine pyar Kiya, Dil, Saajan, Beta, Hum aapke Hain koun, Raja, Mann were shot extensively in Ooty.  Karan Johar's Kuch Kuch Hota Hai was filmed in Ooty.
The diverse landscape of Ooty offers an opportunity to explore a number of adventure sports and recreational activities, including hang gliding. Kalhatty has a launch area that can be reached by jeep. Ooty Golf Course is located in Ooty town. The golf course is at an altitude of 7600 feet. It is owned by the Gymkhana club in Ooty. The England cricket captain Colin Cowdrey was born in Ooty.

 Economy and infrastructure 

Ooty is a market town for the surrounding area which is still largely dependent on agriculture, including the cultivation of "English vegetables" and "English fruits" grown locally. This primarily consists of potato, carrot, cabbage and cauliflower and the fruits being peaches, plums, pears and strawberries. There is a daily wholesale auction of these products at the Ooty Municipal Market. Dairy farming has long been present in the area and there is a cooperative dairy manufacturing cheese and skimmed milk powder. As a result of the local agricultural industry, certain research institutes are based in Ooty. These include a soil conservation centre, livestock farm and a potato research farm. Efforts are being made to diversify the range of local crops with Floriculture and Sericulture being introduced in the local area, as well as the cultivation of mushrooms.

Hindustan Photo Films manufactures photo films in Ooty. Human Biologicals Institute, which manufactures human rabies vaccine is present in Ooty near Pudumand. Other manufacturing industries are located in the outskirts of Ooty. The most significant of these are in Ketti (manufacture of needles); Aruvankadu (manufacture of cordite) and Coonoor (manufacture of rabies vaccine). Cottage industries in the area including chocolate, pickle manufacture, and carpentry. Home-made chocolates are popular among the tourists and the locals. The local area is known for tea cultivation and is economically grown in Ooty, Coonoor, Kotagiri and across Nilgiris district. Soil conditions, elevation, and climatic conditions give flavour to the tea grown here.

Transport

Road

Ooty is well connected to the road network. It is:
 from Coimbatore, 
 from Bengaluru (via Mysore, Bandipur, Mudumalai, Masinagudi and Kallatti), 
 from Mysuru,
Ooty is situated on NH 181 and is connected by road via the five main accepted Nilgiri Ghat Roads.

Rail

Udhagamandalam railway station is connected with Mettupalayam by NMR metre gauge service. It comes under Salem division of Southern Railways. In 1882, a Swiss engineer named Arthur Riggenbach came to the Nilgiri Hills on an invitation from Government of India and he submitted an estimate for a line costing £132,000. The Nilgiri Railway Company was formed in 1885 and planning work commenced in 1886. The work on the line commenced in August 1891 and the Mettupalayam-Coonoor section of the track was opened for traffic on 15 June 1899. In January 1903, the Indian Government purchased the line, and took over the construction of the extension from Coonoor to Ooty.

The Nilgiri Mountain Railway was operated by the Madras Railway until 31 December 1907 on the behalf of the Government. In January 1908, the railway line was handed over to South Indian Railway. The line from Coonoor to Ooty was completed in 1908. On 15 October, Arthur Lawley, Governor of Madras opened the new railway to traffic. The Nilgiri Mountain Railway (NMR) is one of the oldest mountain railways in India and was declared by the UNESCO as a World Heritage Site in July 2005. It is the only rack railway in India, and uses the Abt system.
Sir Arthur Lawley’s Photo Album, Empire and Commonwealth Museum.

Air
Ooty has three helipads, one at Theettukal and two at Kodanad. The Theettukal helipad was approved by Airports Authority of India for defence and VIP services. Pawan Hans was supposed to start its service with Bell 407, but being surrounded by farmland, disruption of the farm animals there has put the operations on hold for commercial activities.

Biodiversity and wildlife

Ooty mostly contains  Temperate Rainforests. It is also part of the South Western Ghats montane rain forests ecoregion. It lies at the junction of the Western Ghats surrounded by dense Sholas''. The pine forest situated between Ooty and Thalakunda is a small downhill region where pine trees are arranged in an orderly fashion. Wenlock Downs is a grassland area typical of the original bioscape of the Nilgiris with gently undulating hills.

Mudumalai is a haven for animals and birds, including elephants and tigers. The tiger population in Mudumalai is 103. The park was created to protect its keystone species, the Nilgiri tahr. The Western Ghats, Nilgiri Sub-Cluster, including all of Mudumalai National Park, is under consideration by the UNESCO World Heritage Committee for selection as a World Heritage Site.

Education

The Government Arts College is one of the oldest institutions in Ooty. It offers various undergraduate and postgraduate programmes in arts and science streams. It is affiliated to Bharathiar University, Coimbatore.

A premiere pharmacy institute ranked 7th in India, the JSS College of Pharmacy is located in a lush  land on Elkhill, Ooty. It offers undergraduate, postgraduate and PhD programmes. It is affiliated with Pharmacy Council of India, AICTE approved programmes. The college has an NBA certified B Pharm programme and ACPE-USA certified Pharm.D programme. It's a constituent college of JSS Academy of Higher Education & Research, Mysuru which is a 'A+' UGC accredited Deemed to be University in India.

Some other notable colleges are the JSS School of Life Sciences, the Monarch Institution of Hotel Management, and the CSI Engineering College, Ketti.

Boarding schools such as the Blue Mountains School have been a feature of Ooty since the days of the British Raj. They offer a significant contribution to the local economy. The facilities and standards of education are considered amongst the highest in India, and so these schools are popular amongst the elite of India and some of the neighbouring countries.

See also

 List of hill stations in India 
 Ooty Radio Telescope
 Ooty varkey
 2021 Indian Air Force Mil Mi-17 crash

References

Further reading

External links
 Official history and tourism page
 

Ooty
Tourism in Tamil Nadu
Hill stations in Tamil Nadu
Mountains of Tamil Nadu
Cities and towns in Nilgiris district
South Western Ghats montane rain forests